Bushmanland was a bantustan in South West Africa (present-day Namibia), intended by the apartheid government to be a self-governing homeland for the San people (the Bushmen). Despite this, a government was not established in the region. The bantustan, then called 'homelands' by the South African authorities, was established with the issue of Proclamation 208 in 1976. 

Bushmanland, like other homelands in South West Africa, was abolished in May 1989 at the start of the transition to independence.

See also
Bushmanland (South Africa)
Apartheid

References

History of Namibia
Bantustans in South West Africa
States and territories disestablished in 1989